Libeň is a cadastral area and district of Prague, Czech Republic. It was incorporated into Prague in 1901.

People 

 Reinhard Heydrich, assassinated here
 Herz Homberg, born here
 Ernestine Schumann-Heink, born here
 Bohumil Hrabal, lived here
 Karel Hlaváček, was born and lived here
 Karel Janoušek, was buried here

Districts of Prague
Prague 7